The following is a list of awards and nominations received by Jimmy Smits.

Smits is the recipient of one Golden Globe Award for his role on NYPD Blue as well as one Primetime Emmy Award (from a total twelve nominations) for L.A. Law. Throughout his career on television, he has garnered eleven Screen Actors Guild Awards, winning once in the Outstanding Performance by an Ensemble in a Drama Series in 1995 for NYPD Blue.

The 2000s saw a resurgence in popularity on television for Smits. He starred on The West Wing from 2004 to 2006 and won an ALMA Award for his role. And in 2012, guest starred on Dexter, for which he received critical acclaim, being nominated for his twelfth Primetime Emmy Award and winning a Saturn Award for Best Guest Starring Role on Television.

From 2012 to 2014, Smits starred in Sons of Anarchy.

Motion picture awards

Independent Spirit Awards

Television awards

ALMA Awards

Critics' Choice Television Awards

Golden Globe Awards

NAACP Image Awards

Primetime Emmy Awards

Satellite Awards

Saturn Awards

Screen Actors Guild Awards

Viewers for Quality Television Awards

References

External links
 
 
 

Smits, Jimmy